Catopsis compacta is a species in the genus Catopsis. This species is endemic to Mexico.

References

compacta
Endemic flora of Mexico